Khemo Rivera (born August 18, 1975) is a swimmer who represented the United States Virgin Islands. He competed in the men's 50 metre freestyle event at the 1996 Summer Olympics.

References

1975 births
Living people
United States Virgin Islands male swimmers
Olympic swimmers of the United States Virgin Islands
Swimmers at the 1996 Summer Olympics
Place of birth missing (living people)